Ohtana/Aapua FF is a Swedish football club located in Ohtanajärvi in Pajala Municipality and Aapua in Övertorneå Municipality, Norrbotten County.

Background
Ohtanajärvi/Aapua Fotbollsförening were formed in 1998 following the merger of the Ohtanajärvi IK and Aapua IF clubs. Ohtanajärvi IK was established on 20 June 1950 at a meeting in the school in Ohtanajärvi

Since their foundation Ohtana/Aapua FF has participated in the middle and lower divisions of the Swedish football league system.  The club currently plays in Division 3 Norra Norrland which is the fifth tier of Swedish football. They play their home matches at the Skolvallen in Ohtanajärvi and Byavallen in Aapua.

Ohtana/Aapua FF are affiliated to the Norrbottens Fotbollförbund. The club compete in the Midnattsolscupen (Midnight Sun Cup) and in 2010 reached the final where they lost on penalties to Stolitsa Moskva.

Recent history
In recent seasons Ohtana/Aapua FF have competed in the following divisions:
2013 Division III, Norra Norrland
2012 Division IV, Norrbotten Norra
2011 Division IV, Norrbotten Norra
2010	Division III, Norra Norrland
2009	Division III, Norra Norrland
2008	Division III, Norra Norrland
2007	Division III, Norra Norrland
2006	Division III, Norra Norrland
2005	Division IV, Norrbotten Norra
2004	Division III, Norra Norrland
2003	Division IV, Norrbotten Norra
2002	Division IV, Norrbotten Norra
2001	Division IV, Norrbotten Norra
2000	Division IV, Norrbotten Norra
1999	Division IV, Norrbotten Norra

Footnotes

External links
 Ohtana/Aapua FF – Official website

Football clubs in Norrbotten County
Association football clubs established in 1998
1998 establishments in Sweden